Neomussaenda is a genus of flowering plants belonging to the family Rubiaceae.

Its native range is Borneo.

Species:

Neomussaenda kostermansiana 
Neomussaenda xanthophytoides

References

Rubiaceae
Rubiaceae genera